Diago  is a  village and rural commune in the Cercle of Kati in the Koulikoro Region of south-western Mali. The commune contains 7 villages and in the 2009 census had a population of 3,269. The village  of Diago is 10 km northwest the town of Kati, the chef-lieu of the cercle.

References

External links
.

Communes of Koulikoro Region